Ioseb "Soso" Irodis dze Grishikashvili (born 25 December 1971) is a Georgian former football goalkeeper.

Career
He played for  Dinamo Tbilisi, FK Ventspils, FK Baku. He has played for Georgia national football team and has won 10 caps, all in friendlies.

References

External links
 

1973 births
Living people
Footballers from Georgia (country)
Expatriate footballers from Georgia (country)
Georgia (country) international footballers
FC Kakheti Telavi players
FC Spartak Vladikavkaz players
FK Ventspils players
FC Dinamo Tbilisi players
FC Kolkheti-1913 Poti players
FC Lokomotivi Tbilisi players
FC Tbilisi players
FC Baku players
FC Mika players
Russian Premier League players
Expatriate footballers in Russia
Expatriate footballers in Latvia
Expatriate footballers in Azerbaijan
Expatriate footballers in Armenia
Association football goalkeepers
FC Dinamo Batumi players
Expatriate sportspeople from Georgia (country) in Azerbaijan
Armenian Premier League players